Manuel Pagliani (born 16 July 1996 in Camposampiero) is an Italian former motorcycle racer. In 2013 and 2014 he was a competitor of the Red Bull MotoGP Rookies Cup; in the latter year he was also the CIV Moto3 champion. In 2016 he won the CIV Moto3 Championship for the second time.

Career statistics

CEV Buckler Moto3 Championship

Races by year
(key) (Races in bold indicate pole position, races in italics indicate fastest lap)

Red Bull MotoGP Rookies Cup

Races by year
(key) (Races in bold indicate pole position, races in italics indicate fastest lap)

FIM CEV Moto3 Junior World Championship

Races by year
(key) (Races in bold indicate pole position, races in italics indicate fastest lap)

Grand Prix motorcycle racing

By season

Races by year
(key) (Races in bold indicate pole position, races in italics indicate fastest lap)

References

External links

Italian motorcycle racers
Living people
1996 births
Moto3 World Championship riders
People from Camposampiero
Sportspeople from the Province of Padua